The Anglican Diocese of Ife East is one of 17 within the Anglican Province of Ibadan, itself one of 14 provinces within the Church of Nigeria. The current bishop is Oluseyi Oyelade.

Ife East Diocese, Anglican Communion, Modakeke, was inaugurated on 28 May 2008 by the Primate of All Nigeria, Peter Jasper Akinola. The first bishop was Rufus Morakinyo Okeremi, who retired in 2010, and was succeeded by Oluseyi Oyelade, elected on 16 April 2010.

Notes

Church of Nigeria dioceses
Dioceses of the Province of Ibadan